"Long time no see" is an English expression used as a greeting by people who have not seen each other for a while.

Long time no see may also refer to:
 "Long Time No See", episode of ABC television sitcom George Lopez
 Long Time No See (album), an album by Chico De Barge
 Long Time No See (5566 album), an album by 5566
 Long Time No See (FM album), an album by FM
 Long Time No See (novel), a novel by Susan Isaacs
 "Long Time No See: Jiraiya Returns!", episode of anime series Naruto